Charles Manning was a New Zealand rugby league footballer who played in the 1910s.

Playing career

Ahuriri, Hawke's Bay, Addington and Canterbury
Charles Manning switched codes midway through the 1912 season and joined the Ahuriri side. He scored 4 tries in one of their matches and gained selection late in the season for the Hawke's Bay side to play the touring New South Wales team. In 1913 he only played 1 match for Ahuriri but played twice for Hawke's Bay against Auckland and Poverty Bay. He also played for New Zealand against the touring New South Wales side on September 6. In 1914 he played 6 times for Ahuriri, and three times for Hawke's Bay. Two of these matches were against Wellington while the other was against the touring England side.

In 1915 he began playing for the Addington club in Christchurch. He went on tour with Canterbury to the West Coast where three matches were played. He played in the first against Greymouth and the third against Hokitika, while refereeing their second match. He scored two tries in the win over Greymouth.

International honours
Manning represented New Zealand in 1913 on their tour of Australia. He played 5 games and scored 3 tries on the tour. He then played for New Zealand against the touring New South Wales side.

References

New Zealand national rugby league team players
New Zealand rugby league players
Place of birth missing
Place of death missing
Rugby league centres
Rugby league five-eighths
Hawke's Bay rugby league team players
Canterbury rugby league team players
Addington Magpies players
Year of birth missing
Year of death missing